Diving was contested at the 2005 West Asian Games in Doha, Qatar from December 5 to December 7. Men's individual and synchronized events were held. All competition took place at the Hamad Aquatic Centre.

Iran and Kuwait won two gold medals each.

Medalists

Medal table

References

External links
Official website (archived)

2005 West Asian Games
2005 in diving
2005